Souk Erbaa usually refers to one of the following souqs:

Souk Erbaa (Sfax) in Sfax, Tunisia
Souk Erbaa (Tunis) in Tunis, Tunisia